The North Jersey Super Football Conference is a football-only athletic league of high schools in New Jersey. The 115-team league was formed in 2016.

History
The NJSFC consists of nearly all of the football playing members of four conferences that were formed after a significant realignment in New Jersey high school athletics saw the creation of several new leagues.

The conferences that came together to form this league were:
The Big North Conference, which consists of many larger public and parochial schools in Passaic County and Bergen County.
The Hudson County Interscholastic League, which consists of most of the public and parochial schools in Hudson County with the exceptions of Secaucus High School, Weehawken High School, and Harrison High School (which all belong to the North Jersey Interscholastic Conference).
The Super Essex Conference, which consists entirely of schools in Essex County.
The Northwest Jersey Athletic Conference, which consists of schools located in Morris County, Sussex County and Warren County.

The league, which included more than one hundred schools, is the largest such league in the United States.

In 2020, the NJSFC announced the forming of what
they referred to as the Ivy Divisions. Two sets of teams play exclusively against each other in the Ivy White and Ivy Red divisions, and both are composed of teams that have consistently had trouble either fielding a team or staying competitive. The teams are grouped together largely regardless of size, and each of the initial schools that compete in the divisions are required to commit to them for two years. Ivy Division schools are precluded from state playoff consideration.

Divisions
There are a total of six sections of the NJSFC, with most consisting of three or four divisions:

United Red 
 Bergen Catholic High School
 Don Bosco Preparatory High School
 Paramus Catholic High School
 Saint Joseph Regional High School
 St. Peter's Preparatory School

United White 
 Delbarton School
 DePaul Catholic High School
 Pope John XXIII Regional High School
 Seton Hall Preparatory School

United Blue
 Hudson Catholic Regional High School
 Immaculata High School
 Immaculate Conception High School (Montclair)
 Morris Catholic High School

Liberty Red 
 Bayonne High School
 East Side High School (Newark)
 Irvington High School
 Kearny High School
 North Bergen High School
 Union City High School

Liberty White 
 Barringer High School
 Bloomfield High School
 East Orange Campus High School
 Livingston High School
 Montclair High School
 West Orange High School

Liberty Blue 
 Clifton High School
 Eastside High School (Paterson)
 John F. Kennedy High School (Paterson)
 Passaic County Technical Institute
 Passaic High School
 Teaneck High School

Freedom Red 
 Hackensack High School
 Northern Highlands Regional High School
 Northern Valley Regional High School at Old Tappan
 Ridgewood High School
 Wayne Hills High School
 Wayne Valley High School

Freedom White 
 Belleville High School
 Columbia High School
 Millburn High School
 Nutley High School
 Orange High School
 West Side High School (Newark)

Freedom Blue 
 Morris Knolls High School
 Morristown High School
 Mount Olive High School
 Randolph High School
 Roxbury High School
 West Morris Central High School

Patriot Red 
 Bergenfield High School
 Northern Valley Regional High School at Demarest
 Pascack Valley High School
 Paramus High School
 Ramapo High School
 River Dell Regional High School

Patriot White 
 Chatham High School
 Montville High School
 Morris Hills High School
 Parsippany Hills High School
 West Essex High School
 West Morris Mendham High School

Patriot Blue 
 Lakeland Regional High School
 Jefferson Township High School
 Passaic Valley Regional High School
 Sparta High School
 Vernon Township High School
 West Milford High School

American Red 
 Dumont High School
 Mahwah High School
 Pascack Hills High School
 Ramsey High School
 Ridgefield Park High School
 Westwood Regional High School

American White 
 Hackettstown High School
 High Point Regional High School
 Kittatinny Regional High School
 Lenape Valley Regional High School
 Newton High School

American Blue 
 Hanover Park High School
 Kinnelon High School
 Madison High School
 Mountain Lakes High School
 Parsippany High School
 Pequannock Township High School

National Red 
 Central High School (Newark)
 Hoboken High School
 Lincoln High School (Newark)
 Malcolm X Shabazz High School (Newark)
 Henry Snyder High School (Newark)

National White 
 Cedar Grove High School
 James Caldwell High School
 Newark Collegiate Academy
 Verona High School
 Weequahic High School (Newark)

National Blue 
 Boonton High School
 Hopatcong High School
 North Warren Regional High School
 Sussex County Technical School
 Wallkill Valley Regional High School
 Whippany Park High School

Ivy Red 
 Bergen Tech
 Cliffside Park High School
 William L. Dickinson High School (Jersey City)
 James J. Ferris High School (Jersey City)
 Fort Lee High School
 Memorial High School (West New York)

Ivy White

 Dover High School
 Dwight Morrow High School (Englewood)
 Fair Lawn High School
 Glen Ridge High School
 Indian Hills High School
 Tenafly High School

References

2016 establishments in New Jersey
New Jersey high school athletic conferences
American football in New Jersey
High school football in the United States